South Platte River Trail may refer to:
 South Platte River Trail in Denver, Colorado
 South Platte River Trail Scenic and Historic Byway, a 19-mile byway in Sedgwick County, Colorado
 South Platte Trail, the historic trail along the South Platte River, from northwestern Colorado to the Denver area